The flag of China is a red field charged in the canton (upper corner nearest the flagpole) with five golden stars.

Flag of China may also refer to:
Flag of the Qing dynasty
Flag of the Republic of China
Flags of the Reorganized National Government of China

See also
Chinese Taipei Olympic flag
List of Chinese flags
Flag of Hong Kong
Flag of Macau